Elizabeth 'Liz' Benson  (born 5 April 1966) is a Nigerian actress,television personality and philanthropist.

Early life and education 
Liz was born in Etinan, Akwa Ibom State in southern Nigeria. She attended Sylvania State College in the United States of America, where she got a degree in Dramatic Arts. Benson began acting when she was 5 years old.

Career

Early success and quitting the film industry
She featured in Fortunes, a television soap opera in 1993. Benson played the part of Mrs. Agnes Johnson in the soap, which ran for about two years on NTA Network. In 1994, her role in Glamour Girls, a successful home video film that focused on the theme of prostitution, cemented her status as a film actress. Benson suddenly quit acting in 1996.

Return to Nollywood
Since returning to Nollywood, it was disclosed that she is a born-again Christian and now preaches the gospel on fulltime-basis. In an interview, she explained that she would only act in films that she believed was in line with her faith.

Personal life 
Benson lost her first husband (Samuel Gabriel Etim) while around her mid-twenties. She said that she actually gained strength from his character and that made her able to carry on with her children through the loss.

The Ibibio-born actress, took another shot at marriage after her conversion. In a quiet court ceremony in Abuja in 2009, She married Bishop Great Ameye of Freedom Family Assembly at the Rainbow Christian Assembly in Warri, Delta State.  The couple are deeply involved in a Christian Evangelical Ministry. While Benson is an evangelist, her husband, Ameye, is a pastor in Jesse Town,Etheop West,Delta State, Benson is an evangelist and lives in Delta State with her husband. Together they run a ministry, Freedom Family Assembly.

Selected filmography 
Some of her more popular roles include her role as Titubi in Femi Osofisan's Morountodun and as Mrs. Agnes Johnson in Fortunes, a soap opera that ran for about two years on Nigerian Television Authority (NTA) Channel 10. She acted in a number of Nollywood video-films such as Evil Men 1 and 2, Shame, Conspiracy, Izaga, Burden, Stolen Child, Faces, Dead End, Tycoon, Glamour Girls, Body of Vengeance and a horde of other movies which includes:

References

External links 
 

1966 births
Living people
Nigerian Christians
Actresses from Delta State
20th-century Nigerian actresses
21st-century Nigerian actresses
Actresses in Yoruba cinema
Nigerian television actresses
Nigerian film actresses
Nigerian Pentecostal pastors
Nigerian Christian clergy
Yoruba people
People from Akwa Ibom State